WISA (1390 AM) is a radio station broadcasting a Spanish News/Talk format. It is licensed to Isabela, Puerto Rico. The station serves as a semi-satellite for WIAC 740 and is currently owned by Radio Noroeste Broadcasting, a subsidiary of Bestov Broadcast Group. It airs a News/Talk format.

WISA as a semi-satellite of WIAC, produces local programming from the studios located in Isabela, covering the Northern and Western area.

References

External links

ISA
Radio stations established in 1946
Isabela, Puerto Rico